Matt Bickerstaff (born 27 April 1976) is an Australian former professional rugby league footballer who played in the 1990s and 2000s.

Playing career
Bickerstaff was born in Sydney. He signed with the South Queensland Crushers and his first grade debut was in Round 4 of the 1996 ARL season against local rivals, the Brisbane Broncos. Both of Bickerstaff's seasons at South Queensland ended with wooden spoons.

In 2002, Bickerstaff joined Cronulla-Sutherland and in his first season made 20 appearances for the club as they reached the preliminary final before losing to New Zealand. Bickerstaff left Cronulla at the end of 2004. He then went on to have spells with St George and Canberra.

Bickerstaff retired having played 103 first grade games, and scoring 13 tries. When he played his last game with the Raiders, Bickerstaff was the last former South Queensland Crushers player still playing in the NRL.

References

Sources
 Whiticker, Alan & Hudson, Glen (2006) The Encyclopedia of Rugby League Players, Gavin Allen Publishing, Sydney

1976 births
Living people
Australian rugby league players
Canberra Raiders players
Cronulla-Sutherland Sharks players
Rugby league locks
Rugby league players from Sydney
Rugby league second-rows
South Queensland Crushers players
St. George Illawarra Dragons players